The Metropolitan Cathedral of the Immaculate Conception of Mary (Spanish: Catedral Metropolitana de la Inmaculada Concepción de María), referred to as the New Cathedral (La Nueva Catedral), is located in Managua, Nicaragua. It was dedicated to the Immaculate Conception of the Virgin Mary.

History
The cathedral was built in 1991 to serve as a replacement for the Old Cathedral of Managua or St. James' Cathedral (Catedral de Santiago). The old cathedral was damaged and thought to be unrestoreable after a 1972 earthquake that destroyed 90% of the city.

The new cathedral was designed by the Mexican architect Ricardo Legorreta. Construction began around August 1991, and the cathedral was inaugurated on September 4, 1993. The cost of the newly built cathedral was estimated at $4.5 million. The new cathedral has generated much controversy, particularly about its architectural style and finance. 
The costs were covered partially thanks to the help of American Tom Monaghan, owner of Domino's Pizza. 
Locals refer to it as La Chichona on account of the plethora of cupolas adorning it which resemble many chichas (Spanish: slang for "breasts").

A fire started by a Molotov cocktail damaged an image of Sangre de Cristo y el Santísimo in the cathedral on July 31, 2020. Neither of the two people in the cathedral at the time were injured.

See also
Managua
Religion in Nicaragua

References

External links
Curiamanagua.org  

Roman Catholic cathedrals in Nicaragua
Buildings and structures in Managua
Roman Catholic churches completed in 1993
Tourist attractions in Managua
Ricardo Legorreta buildings
20th-century Roman Catholic church buildings in Nicaragua
Eclectic architecture